is a private junior college in Higashi-ku, Nagoya, Aichi Prefecture, Japan, established in 1950.

External links
 Official website 

Educational institutions established in 1950
Private universities and colleges in Japan
Universities and colleges in Nagoya
Japanese junior colleges
1950 establishments in Japan